The College of Complexes is a loose organization committed to free speech, those interested in continuing adult education, and focusing on social issues and current events. The name is derived from "a psychiatric term for repressed ideas that compel expression." The underlying purpose is to solve all the world's problems.

History
This organization was founded in Chicago on January 6, 1951, by Myron Reed "Slim" Brundage, at 1651 North Wells St in Old Town. The organization changed locations on several occasions.  Through the 1950s into the 1960s the Chicago Police Department's Red Squad unit visited them several times because of College of Complexes's anti-Cold War stance.

The College of Complexes claims to be a "Playground for People Who Think," and seeks "to disquiet the minds of the people." The primary function of this group is to organize weekly free speech forums where speakers, representing diverse points of view, will make a presentation. Following the speech, audience members are invited to make "remarks and/or rebuttals," and each is allowed a maximum of 5 minutes to respond. Order is maintained at meetings by adherence to the college's only, and long-standing rule, of listening to "One Fool at a Time."

The diverse topics covered in this forum have included:
"Frederic Bastiat and 'The Law'",
"Universal Law and the Code of Humanity",
"Why I Refuse to Confirm or Deny Anything",
"A Revolutionary Party for a Reactionary Period",
"The Non-Fiction of Ayn Rand: 'The Virtue of Selfishness' and 'Capitalism: The Unknown Idea'",
"The Persistence of Nationalism",
"Evolving Concept of Wilderness",
"The Manifesto of Resistance",
"The Roots of the Welfare State",
"How to Become a Millionaire in a Few Days",
"How to Photograph a Spirit",
"The Libertarian Party Platform",
"Time - Defining the Nonspacial Continuum",
"Archeology and Life in an Eco-Village",
"Institutionalized Salvation Belief Systems",
"Astrology / Horoscope of the United States",
"Lessons of the Russian Revolution",
"Why Peace is Neither Necessary Nor Desirable",
"Hidden Themes of the Bible",
"Living in Marijuana Consciousness",
"The Conspiracy Against Reality", and
"The History and Ideas of the Libertarian Movement."

The college has issued a "Statement of Free Speech" which maintains that: "Our constitution and laws encourage the freest possible exchange of opinions, ideas, and information.  In part, that recognizes our worth and dignity as human beings.  To forbid us to speak our minds demeans us and makes us more like slaves or robots than citizens of a free country.  But as important as freedom of expression is for us as individuals, it is perhaps more important to society at large."

Currently, the College of Complexes holds these forums at Dappers East Restaurant, 2901 West Addison Street in Chicago, IL on Saturday evenings from 6:00 to 9:00 PM.  All meetings are open to the public, with a $3.00 tuition fee and no membership is maintained.  The college is volunteer operated.  Anyone wishing to speak may do so by contacting the Program Coordinator. 

Over 150+ programs have been videotaped, and an archive termed a "Lecture Library" is maintained at the website.  The College currently meets at Dappers East Restaurant, located at 2901 W Addison St, Chicago, IL.  Program meets every Saturday night at 6:00 PM.  

Several satellite campuses have been opened in other cities from time to time, with one presently meeting in Dallas, TX.

References

External links
 

Organizations based in Chicago
Social centres in the United States
1951 establishments in Illinois
Culture of Chicago